Oscar Pehrsson (born 10 April 1988) is a Swedish footballer who plays for Akropolis IF.

References

External links 
 

Swedish footballers
Allsvenskan players
Superettan players
Ettan Fotboll players
1988 births
Living people
Västerås SK Fotboll players
IK Sirius Fotboll players
IF Brommapojkarna players
Akropolis IF players
Association football defenders